Fimetariella is a genus of fungi within the Lasiosphaeriaceae family.

References

External links
Fimetariella at Index Fungorum

Lasiosphaeriaceae